Henfield is an electoral division of West Sussex in the United Kingdom and returns one member to sit on West Sussex County Council. The current County Councillor, Lionel Barnard, is also Deputy Leader of West Sussex County Council.

Extent
The division covers the town of Henfield; and the villages of Cowfold, Dial Post, Partridge Green, Shermanbury and West Grinstead.

It comprises the following Horsham District wards: Cowfold, Shermanbury & West Grinstead Ward and Henfield Ward; and of the following civil parishes: Cowfold, the northern part of Henfield, Shermanbury and West Grinstead.

Election results

2013 Election
Results of the election held on 2 May 2013:

2009 Election
Results of the election held on 4 June 2009:

2005 Election
Results of the election held on 5 May 2005:

References
Election Results - West Sussex County Council

External links
 West Sussex County Council
 Election Maps

Electoral Divisions of West Sussex